In chemistry, transition metal silyl complexes describe coordination complexes in which a transition metal is bonded to an anionic silyl ligand, forming a metal-silicon sigma bond.  This class of complexes are numerous and some are technologically significant as intermediates in hydrosilylation.  These complexes are a subset of organosilicon compounds.

Synthesis

From silyl halides
The first examples were prepared by treatment of sodium cyclopentadienyliron dicarbonyl with trimethylsilyl chloride:
(C5H5)Fe(CO)2Na  +  Me3SiCl  →  (C5H5)Fe(CO)2SiMe3  +  NaCl 
A related reaction is the oxidative addition of silyl halides.

From hydrosilanes
Hydrosilanes oxidatively add to low-valent metal complexes to give silyl metal hydrides.  Such species are assumed to be intermediates in hydrosilylation catalysis.  The oxidative addition is preceded by the association of the intact hydrosilane with the unsaturated metal center, affording a sigma-silane complex.

Sigma bond metathesis can occur when hydrosilanes are treated with early metals alkyls.  Using the Petasis reagent, a cyclic dititanium complex is produced with elimination of methane (Me = CH3, Ph = C6H5)
2 (C5H5)2TiMe2  + 2 Ph2SiH2  →   [(C5H5)2TiSiPh2]2   +  4 MeH

Oxidative addition of Si-Si bonds
Low valent metals insert into the Si-Si bond of disilanes.  The main limitation of this reaction is the paucity of disilanes as reagents.

Silyl complexes with Si-Si bonds
Beyond simple ligands like SiR3-, silyl ligands with Si-Si bonds are known. (C5H5)Fe(CO)2-SiMe2SiPh3 is one example (Me = CH3, Ph = C6H5). Another example is the metalacycle derived from titanocene dichloride, (C5H5)2Ti(SiPh2)5.

References